Lydie Vanhille (born 23 April 1967) is a French former professional tennis player.

Vanhille, who had a best singles world ranking of 231, featured as a wildcard in the singles main draw of the 1987 French Open. She won her first round match over Alexia Dechaume, then lost in the second round to Petra Huber.

References

External links
 
 

1967 births
Living people
French female tennis players